In Amenas Airport, also called Zarzaitine Airport , is an airport serving In Amenas, a town in the Illizi Province of southeastern Algeria.

In 2007, the airport handled 145,070 passengers and had 3,627 aircraft movements.

Airlines and destinations

References

External links
 Google Maps - In Amenas
 Great Circle Mapper - In Amenas
 
 

Airports in Algeria
Buildings and structures in Illizi Province